The 1994–95 Scottish First Division season was won by Raith Rovers, who were promoted one point ahead of Dunfermline Athletic and Dundee. Ayr United and Stranraer were relegated.

Table

Play-off

References

Scottish First Division seasons
Scot
2